Mikael Rothstein (born 8 May 1961) is an associate professor of religious history at the University of Copenhagen in Copenhagen, Denmark.

Rothstein earned his PhD in 1993 and became a Lector at the University of Copenhagen in 2001. He has been on the board of the Danish Association for the History of Religions (DAHR) and the editorial boards of the publications Renner Studies on New Religions (Aarhus University Press) and Nye Religioner (Gyldendal).

Rothstein has been called one of Denmark's top researchers in new religious movements, and has been credited with making them a topic of scholarship.

Another area of scholarly interest is indigenous religions; he was the first researcher to describe the Penan people of Borneo.

Among books he has written or co-edited are: Belief Transformations: Some Aspects of the Relation between Science and Religion in Transcendental Meditation (TM) and the International Society for Krishna Consciousness (ISKCON) (1996), Secular Theories on Religion: Current Perspectives (2000) (co-author with Tim Jensen),  New Age Religion and Globalization (2002), New Religions in a Postmodern World (2003) (co-editor with Reender Kranenborg) and The Cambridge Companion to New Religious Movements (2012) (co-editor with Olav Hammer).

Rothstein has been involved in some conflicts in the media. In 2007 he was criticized after defending Ungdomshuset. In 2011 he was one of those criticizing the rephrasing of the mission of Denmark's state-owned broadcasting service, DR, to include promoting Christian values, which he called "a way of making us all hostages to a nationalist Christian project". He has called Lars Hedegaard "an assailant", leading to criticism from other free speech advocates. He has been described in a Christian periodical as "uncompromising [and] a wonderful, intelligent man who is both warm, caring and generous with praise for both colleagues and students" and by another commentator in the same publication as demonstrating "one-sided bile" and "hatred" in his utterances concerning Christianity. An opinion article in another newspaper likewise portrayed him as a hater of religion.

Rothstein and his wife, Mie, have two children. His brother, Klaus Rothstein, is a well known TV journalist.

References

External links
 Mikael Rothstein at University of Copenhagen 
 Interview on the future of religion, DR P1, October 16, 2006 (audio) 

20th-century Danish historians
21st-century Danish historians
Danish male writers
Academic staff of the University of Copenhagen
Researchers of new religious movements and cults
1961 births
Living people
University of Copenhagen alumni
Danish Ashkenazi Jews